

Sapphiretown is a locality in the Australian state  of South Australia located on the north coast of Dudley Peninsula on Kangaroo Island overlooking Eastern Cove about  south of the state capital of Adelaide and about  south-west of Penneshaw.  

The locality was originally declared as a government town in January 1878 by Sir William Jervois, the tenth governor of South Australia for a site surveyed in March 1877.  The locality's boundaries which were created in March 2002 include the former government town of Sapphiretown.  The name is derived from HMS Sapphire, a sloop, which conveyed Jervois to South Australia in October 1877 to take up his appointment as Governor of South Australia.

As of 2014, Sapphiretown consisted of land at the western end of Dudley Peninsula and which concludes as a spit known as Strawbridge Point at its north-western extremity and which is bounded to the north by Eastern Cove in Nepean Bay and by the body of water known as American River to the west.  The locality is zoned for residential use exclusively for “detached dwellings” and “tourist accommodation.”  

Sapphiretown is located within the federal division of Mayo, the state electoral district of Mawson and the local government area of the Kangaroo Island Council.

See also
Sapphire (disambiguation)

References
Notes

Citations

Towns on Kangaroo Island
Dudley Peninsula